Sheikh Fahad Al-Ahmed Al-Jaber Al-Sabah (August 12, 1945 – August 2, 1990) was a member of the House of Sabah and a Kuwaiti military officer who was also the founder of the Asian Handball Federation and Kuwait Olympic Committee. Fahad was killed fighting alongside the Kuwait Emiri Guard in defending Dasman Palace on the first day of the Iraqi invasion of Kuwait.

Early life
Fahad was the son of Ahmad Al-Jaber Al-Sabah and was educated in Kuwait for his primary and secondary schooling.

Military career
Fahad was commissioned in the Kuwait Armed Forces on April 22, 1963 as an Aspirant. He pursued further military training in a military institution in the United Kingdom on July 30, 1964. Fahad was subsequently promoted to Second lieutenant on July 19, 1965 and First lieutenant on March 1, 1967. On June 7, 1970 he was promoted to the rank of Captain.

Military commands

 Acting commander by delegation of the 2nd Commando Battalion, Kuwait 25th Commando Brigade attached to the Yarmouk Brigade
 Staff Officer in the Kuwait Emiri Guard on November 25, 1968 in the rank of First-Lieutenant

Fatah membership and Six-Day War, 1967
Fahad was a member of the Palestinian group Fatah when it was headquartered in Jordan and later when it moved to Lebanon. In June 1967, the Kuwait Armed Forces were engaged outside the borders of Kuwait for the first time, during the Six-Day War between Israel and four Arab countries (Egypt, Iraq, Syria and Jordan). Fahad took part in the Six-Day War attached to the Yarmouk Brigade of the Kuwait Army; as acting commander by delegation of the 2nd Commando Battalion, on the Egyptian front.

In 1971 Fahad was arrested as a fighter in Lebanon and sent to Kuwait.

Olympic and sports administration career

Kuwait sports
 President, Kuwait Olympic Committee, 1974–1985 and 1989–1990.
 President, Qadsia Sports Club, 1969–1979.
 President, Kuwait Basketball Federation, 1974–1978.

Arab sports 
 First Vice President, Arab Sports Union 1976–1990.
 First Vice- President, Arab Basketball Federation 1974–1976.

Asian sports 
 President, Asian Handball Federation, 1974–1990.
 President, Asian Games Federation, 1979–1982.
 President, Olympic Council of Asia, 1982–1990.

International sports
 Vice-President, International Handball Federation, 1980–1990.
 Vice-President, Association of National Olympic Committee, 1979–1990.
 Member, International Olympic Committee, 1981–1990.
 Member, IOC Executive Board, 1985–1989.

1982 World Cup incident
During the match against France at the 1982 FIFA World Cup, France scored a goal while some of the Kuwaiti players had stopped, having heard a whistle. The goal was initially awarded by the referee, who had not blown, but was cancelled after Fahad stepped onto the field and ordered the referee to reverse his decision. In 1988, Fahad invited Michel Platini (at the time the French football team's captain) to play for Kuwait in a preparatory match against the USSR. Platini played for 21 minutes, and was framed by the Kuwaitis as an apology for his unethical behavior eight years before.

Dasman Palace 

In August 1990, Iraq invaded Kuwait. While Kuwait was being overrun, the Emir of Kuwait escaped from the country. Various Military Forces units were engaged in different battle sectors; Fahad died fighting alongside the Kuwait Emiri Guard commanders in the Battle of Dasman Palace.

Personal life
Fahad was married and was the father of five sons and one daughter. One of his sons is Ahmed Al-Fahad Al-Ahmed Al-Sabah, who was president of the Olympic Council of Asia, as well as a member of the International Olympic Committee.

Honours and awards

National 
 Military Service Medal, Bronze
 Medal of Military Duty, First Class

Foreign 
 Order of military courage of Egypt, First Class
 Order of Republic of Tunisia
 Order of Republic of Yemen, First Class
 Honorary Doctorate from Helwan University, Egypt
 Olympic Gold Medal from the General Secretariat of the Cooperation Council for the Arab States of the Gulf
 Appreciation Decoration on behalf of UNESCO
 Honorary Doctorate in Law from University of Seoul, South Korea
 Honorary citizenship of Japan

See also 
 Military of Kuwait

References

1945 births
1990 deaths
House of Al-Sabah
Sport in Kuwait
Founders of sporting institutions
Anti-Zionism
Military personnel killed in the Gulf War
Deaths by firearm in Kuwait
Kuwaiti murder victims
People murdered in Kuwait
Fatah members
Sons of monarchs